Hatteras  may refer to:
 The Adventures of Captain Hatteras, the novel by Jules Verne
 Hatteras Networks, a North Carolina-based telecommunications equipment provider
 Hatteras Indians, the Roanoke-Hatteras Indian tribe

Places:
 Hatteras, North Carolina
 Hatteras Island, an island in North Carolina's Outer Banks
 Cape Hatteras, a key navigation point along the eastern seaboard of the United States
 Cape Hatteras Lighthouse, a historic navigational aid

Vehicles:
 USS Hatteras (AVP-42), a Barnegat-class small seaplane tender that was canceled in 1943, prior to construction
 USS Hatteras (1861), a steamer which served during the American Civil War
 USS Hatteras (ID-2142), which served as a cargo ship during World War I, and was decommissioned in 1919